Paul Kukubo is the Chief Executive of the Kenya ICT Board. He started the first interactive agency in East Africa, 3mice Interactive. 
Mr. Kukubo held senior roles in Marketing and Advertising, including a Directorship at McCann-Erickson Kenya, before co-founding the technology firm 3mice Interactive Ltd.

He was previously Chairman of the Marketing Society of Kenya where he spearheaded the Brand Kenya initiative, which led to the development of the Brand Kenya Board, the State Corporation in charge of Kenya's brand development.

Education 
Kukubo holds a Bachelor of Arts Degree in Economics and Sociology (Hons) from the University of Nairobi. in 2011, he graduated with a Global Executive Masters of Business Administration (GEMBA) from United States International University, Africa (USIA-A) in partnership with Columbia Business School.

Other Achievements 
He is a director in various Organisations in Kenya including:-
•	Non-executive Director and Co-Founder of 3mice Interactive Ltd.
•	Non-executive Director, Kenya School of Professional Studies

He was named one of the Top 100 Most Influential Kenyans to Watch by The East African Standard (Est. 1902), the longest-serving newspaper in the region.  He is married with two children.

External links
 Top 100 Most influential Kenyans
 Kenya ICT Board
 Kenya information Guide

Kenyan businesspeople
Living people
Year of birth missing (living people)